George Augustus Rochfort, 2nd Earl of Belvedere (12 October 1738 – 13 May 1814) was an Anglo-Irish peer and politician.

Early years

George Augustus Rochfort was born on 12 October 1738, son of Robert Rochfort, 1st Earl of Belvedere and Hon. Mary Molesworth. The Rochfort family, originally called De Rupe Forti, had settled in Ireland in 1243. Sir Maurice de Rochfort was Lord Justice of Ireland in 1302. Gerald Rochfort was summoned to Parliament as a baron in 1339. George's great-grandfather was the prominent lawyer Robert Rochfort, Attorney General of Ireland and Speaker of the House of Commons in 1695, and Lord Chief Baron of the Exchequer in 1707. The family estate of Gaulstown lay on the shore of Lough Ennell in County Westmeath.

George's father, Robert Rochfort, was a favourite courtier of King George II of Great Britain. He was made an Irish peer as Baron of Bellfield in 1737, and then Earl of Belvedere in 1756. He was estranged from his mother during his childhood, after his father locked her away after an alleged affair with George's uncle, Arthur.

Politician

From 1756 to 1774 George Rochfort was styled Viscount Belfield. He was Member of Parliament for Philipstown from 1758–61, and Member of Parliament for Westmeath from 1761–1774.

The 1761 parliamentary election in County Westmeath followed the death of King George II of Great Britain. George Rochfort, the Right Honorable Lord Belfield, won the election. He was supported by The Honorable Captain Richard Rochfort, Esq. and opposed by Mr. George Rochfort and Gustavus Lambert. The election thus seems to have been very much a family affair. Mr. George Rochfort supported the "Patriots", who demanded that parliaments last only seven years before being dissolved, rather than for the lifetime of the king, as was the custom.

In 1762 George Rochfort was Sheriff of County Westmeath, and from 1772 to 1814 Governor of County Westmeath. An anonymous writer named "Dymoke" published a Review of the House of Commons in the Freeman's Journal in 1774. The purpose was to "rouse the electors of Ireland to a due exertion of their lawful powers, and stimulate them to fix on proper men to maintain their rights and privileges in parliament." He noted that Belfield, who was muster-master-general of Ireland and a Governor of the County of Westmeath, had voted for the stamp act. Dykmore declared that "The present members [Lord Belfield; Anthony Malone] for the County of WESTMEATH will never represent it again if the Electors have either sense, honour, or remembrance".

Irish peer

On 13 November 1774 Rochfort succeeded to the titles of Baron Belfield, Viscount Belfield and Earl of Belvedere after his father's death. He released his mother. She was prematurely aged, spoke in little more than a whisper but in a harsh, agitated and uneven manner, and was dressed in the style of thirty years earlier.

From 1775–76 Rochfort was Grand Master of the Freemasons Grand Lodge of Ireland. On 20 August 1775 he married Dorothea Bloomfield, daughter of John Bloomfield and Jane Jocelyn. George Rochfort took his mother with him when he and his new wife visited the continent, but she found the travel too difficult. They left her to recuperate in a convent in France while they visited Italy for a few months, spending the winter in Florence. The next year the couple returned to London, where George's mother stayed with a friend in Kensington Palace for a year. She then returned to Ireland and lived first with George in Dublin and then with his sister, now Countess of Lanesborough, and her young family. She died a few years after her husband.

Rochfort had Belvedere House built on Great Denmark Street, Dublin, at the great sum of £24,000. The site had been owned by Nicholas Archdall. The building had been started by the first Earl, with Robert West as the architect. Rochfort and his wife apparently did not plan to complete the work, and in 1777 offered it for sale. Later they decided to complete the house for their own use, and gave the job to Michael Stapleton. It was finally completed and occupied in 1786, and probably stood alone at first, since in 1787 Rochfort was recorded as living in North Great George's Street. George's mother is thought to have died there.

During the struggle over the Acts of Union 1800, Rochfort's position on the union of the crowns of Britain and Ireland was uncertain. A letter of 25 January 1800 from Lord Altamont to the Earl of Lucan said "Ld Belvedere has touched Government cash & possibly may not exert all his influence to give value in return for it".

Rochfort's first wife died on 6 April 1803, and on 10 November 1803, he married Jane Mackay, daughter of Reverend James Mackay. They had one son, who died in infancy. George Augustus Rochfort died in Great Denmark Street, Dublin on 13 May 1814 at the age of 75. He is buried in St Sinian, Clonfad Parish Church, of the Church of Ireland. His tomb is adorned with a full-scale neoclassical sculptural group by John Bacon the younger. It represents the earl on his death bed, with his young wife weeping at the end. He is supported by Faith and an angelic figure is beckoning him to heaven.

Rochfort had no surviving children, and his three peerages became extinct. On his death, his sister Jane inherited the whole settled part of his great estate, since his brothers had died without children. He left his entire unsettled estate to his wife. This consisted of at least 2,500 Irish acres, bringing in a large income. The fortune was passed down to his wife's children by her second marriage to Abraham Boyd. The eldest son and heir  was George Augustus Boyd-Rochfort, and he assumed the arms and surname of Rochfort.

References
Notes

Citations

Sources

 

1738 births
1814 deaths
Earls in the Peerage of Ireland
18th-century Anglo-Irish people
Members of the Parliament of Ireland (pre-1801) for King's County constituencies
Members of the Parliament of Ireland (pre-1801) for County Westmeath constituencies
Irish MPs 1727–1760
Irish MPs 1761–1768